Annika Susanne Hallin is a Swedish actress. She was born in Hägersten, Stockholm, and studied at the Swedish National Academy of Mime and Acting 1995 – 1999. In 2001 Hallin was one of those who started Teater Nova.

Filmography

1999: En häxa i familjen - Schoolteacher
2000: Soldater i månsken (TV Mini-Series) - Li
2002: Skeppsholmen (TV Series) - Anja Kulle
2002: Beck (TV Series) - Mamman
2004: Graven (TV Mini-Series) - Fanny Popescu
2005: Kissed by Winter - Victoria
2006: När mörkret faller - Stella Forsberg
2007: Arn – The Knight Templar - Syster Leonore
2008: Arn – The Kingdom at Road's End - Syster Leonore (uncredited)
2008: Patrick, Idade 1,5 - Eva
2009: De halvt dolda (TV Mini-Series) - Mia
2009: Glowing Stars - Liv
2009: The Girl - The Mother
2009: Män som hatar kvinnor - Annika Giannini
2009: The Girl Who Played with Fire - Annika Giannini
2009: Luftslottet som sprängdes - Annika Giannini
2010: Pax - Legeass Kaja
2010: Wallander (TV Series) - Claire
2010: Drottningoffret (TV Mini-Series) - Lili Frykberg
2011: Stockholm Östra - Minnas mamma
2011: Anno 1790 (TV Series) - Eleonora Wide
2012: Flimmer - Ulla
2013: Crimes of Passion (TV Series)
2014: Pojken med guldbyxorna - Katarina Heed
2015: My Skinny Sister - Karin
2015: Det borde finnas regler - Mamma
2017: Ravens - Veronika's Mother
2017: Black Widows (TV Series) - Gittan Sundell

References and sources

Internet Movie Database
Swedish Film Database

Swedish film actresses
Swedish television actresses
Actresses from Stockholm
Living people
Year of birth missing (living people)